Septocrinidae is a family of echinoderms belonging to the order Comatulida.

Genera:
 Rouxicrinus Mironov & Pawson, 2010
 Septocrinus Mironov, 2000
 Zeuctocrinus Clark, 1973

References

Comatulida
Echinoderm families